Henrik Holm (born 1968) is a Swedish tennis player.

Henrik Holm may also refer to:

Henrik Holm (actor) (born 1995), Norwegian actor
Henrik Holm (ice hockey) (born 1990), Norwegian ice hockey player